Être Dieu: opéra-poème, audiovisuel et cathare en six parties (French for "Being God: a Cathar Audiovisual Opera-Poem in Six Parts") is a self-proclaimed "opera-poem" written by Spanish surrealist painter Salvador Dalí, based on a libretto by Manuel Vázquez Montalbán with music by French avant-garde musician Igor Wakhévitch. It was originally published in 1985.

The six-part work features Dalí as God, Brigitte Bardot as an artichoke and Catherine the Great and Marilyn Monroe do a striptease. It has been published in an extremely rare 3 LP box-set by a Spanish label. It was re-released in a regular 3CD box published by German-label Eurostar who subsequently went out of business, and there are few-to-no known performances of the work. Dalí painted "Self-Portrait" (1972) to mark the composition of the opera, which was later auctioned by the United States Customs Service after being seized after Colombian drug lords tried to use the painting to launder money.

Tracklist:

A.	Ouverture Et Première Entrée 	22:12

B. 	Deuxième Entrée Ou La Lutte Avec L'Ange 	22:12

C.	Troisième Entrée Et Première Sortie 	24:25

D. 	Le Rêve Passe 	23:33

E. 	Quatrième Entrée Ou La Profession De Foi 	27:42

F.	Final Et Seconde Sortie 	25:00

Credits

 Composed By – Igor Wakhévitch, M. Vázquez Montalban*, Pierre Delabre, Salvador Dalí
 Conductor – Boris de Vinogradow
 Drums – François Auger
 Electric Bass – Didier Batard
 Electric Guitar – J.J. Flety*, J.P. Castelain*
 Engineer – Claude Wagner
 Engineer [Assistant] – A. Robert Bourdet*
 Orchestra – Ensemble Polyphonique De Paris Et Orchestre*
 Painting [Insert] – Salvador Dalí
 Percussion [Solo] – Sylvio Gualda
 Soprano Vocals – Eve Brenner
 Synthesizer – Igor Wakhévitch
 Violin [Electric] – M. Ripoche*
 Voice Actor [El Divino Dalí] – Salvador Dalí
 Voice Actor [El Narrador Y El Recitador] – Didier Haudepin
 Voice Actor [El Ángel] – Alain Cuny
 Voice Actor [El] – Raymond Gérôme
 Voice Actor [Ella] – Delphine Seyrig
 Voice Actor [La Narradora] – Catherine Allegret

Recorded at Pathé Marconi studios, Boulogne, France.

References

Salvador Dali opera images 

Works by Salvador Dalí
Operas
French-language operas
1985 operas
Cultural depictions of Brigitte Bardot
Cultural depictions of Catherine the Great
Cultural depictions of Marilyn Monroe
Fiction about God
Surreal comedy
Operas based on real people